In deformation theory, a branch of mathematics, Deligne's conjecture is about the operadic structure on Hochschild cochain complex. Various proofs have been suggested by Dmitry Tamarkin, Alexander A. Voronov, James E. McClure and Jeffrey H. Smith, Maxim Kontsevich and Yan Soibelman, and others, after an initial input of construction of homotopy algebraic structures on the Hochschild complex. It is of importance in relation with string theory.

See also 
piecewise algebraic space

References

Further reading 
 https://ncatlab.org/nlab/show/Deligne+conjecture
 https://mathoverflow.net/questions/374/delignes-conjecture-the-little-discs-operad-one

Algebraic topology
String theory
Conjectures